The Villeray—Saint-Michel—Parc-Extension borough council is the local governing body of Villeray—Saint-Michel—Parc-Extension, a borough in the City of Montreal. The council consists of five members: the borough mayor (who also serves as a Montreal city councillor) and four city councillors who are elected for the borough's four districts.

Current members
Borough mayor: Giuliana Fumagalli
Montreal city councillor, Saint-Michel division: Josué Corvil
Montreal city councillor, François-Perrault division: Sylvain Ouellet
Montreal city councillor, Villeray division: Rosannie Filato
Montreal city councillor, Parc-Extension division: Mary Deros

References

Municipal government of Montreal
Villeray–Saint-Michel–Parc-Extension